Gemmathrips is a genus of thrips in the family Phlaeothripidae.

Species
 Gemmathrips brevis

References

Phlaeothripidae
Thrips genera